Olivier Fontenette (born 13 January 1982) is a French footballer who played for clubs including K.V. Kortrijk.

See also
Football in France
List of football clubs in France

References

1982 births
Living people
French footballers
FC Gueugnon players
AS Cherbourg Football players
K.S.K. Beveren players
Stade de Reims players
K.V. Kortrijk players
Association football defenders